Svärd, meaning "Sword", is a surname of Swedish origin which may refer to:

People
Anna Svärd (born 1973),  Swedish curler 
Catharina Elmsäter-Svärd (born 1965), Swedish politician of the Moderate Party 
Gunilla Svärd (born 1970), Swedish orienteering competitor 
Nils Svärd (1908–2001), Swedish cross country skier who competed in the early 1930s 
Oskar Svärd (born 1976), Swedish Cross-country skier 
Sebastian Svärd (born 1983), Danish footballer

Other
Lotta Svärd (poem), part of Johan Ludvig Runeberg's epic poem The Tales of Ensign Stål
Lotta Svärd, Finnish voluntary auxiliary paramilitary organization for women

Surnames
Swedish-language surnames